The 1905–06 Butler Bulldogs men's basketball team represents Butler University during the 1905–06 college men's basketball season. The head coach was Walter Kelly, coaching in his second season with the Bulldogs.

Schedule

|-

References

Butler Bulldogs men's basketball seasons
Butler
Butl
Butl